The 2012 Plaid leadership election was held following the resignation of Ieuan Wyn Jones following the 2011 Assembly Elections. Following the election Jones originally stated that he would resign in the first half of the Assembly term. Nominations officially opened on 3 January 2012.

The leadership was fought by former Agriculture Minister Elin Jones, former party leader Dafydd Elis-Thomas and backbencher Leanne Wood. Simon Thomas declared his intention to run, but later withdrew in favour of Elin Jones.

The Guardian reported that 7,863 members were entitled to vote, which was an increase in membership of 23% over the preceding four-month period.

Leanne Wood was declared leader on 15 March 2012, taking over as leader the day after.

Results

Endorsements

Of the 11 Plaid Assembly Members, Elin Jones received the support of 6 (including herself), Leanne Wood won the backing of 3 (including herself) and Dafydd Elis-Thomas 1 (himself). Out going leader Ieuan Wyn Jones did not publicly back any candidate.

Elin Jones
AMs:
Jocelyn Davies
Rhodri Glyn Thomas
Alun Ffred Jones
Simon Thomas
Llyr Huws Gruffydd

MPs
Hywel Williams

Others
Dafydd Trystan
Dai Lloyd, former AM
Nerys Evans, former AM
Cynog Dafis, former AM and MP

Dafydd Elis-Thomas
Councillor Delme Bowen, 
Dyfed Edwards, Leader of Gwynedd County Council
Chris Franks, former AM

Leanne Wood
AMs:
Bethan Jenkins
Lindsay Whittle

MPs:
Jonathan Edwards (Campaign Manager)

Others:
Adam Price, former MP

References

2012
2012 elections in the United Kingdom
2012 in Wales
2010s elections in Wales
Political party leadership elections in Wales
Plaid Cymru leadership election